Elizabeth Redding Jessup is an American computer scientist specializing in numerical linear algebra and the generalized minimal residual method. She is a professor emerita of computer science at the University of Colorado Boulder.

Education and career
Jessup is one of three children of an Indianapolis tax attorney. She majored in mathematics at Williams College, and went to Yale University for graduate study, earning a master's degree in applied physics and a Ph.D. in computer science there. Her 1989 dissertation, Parallel Solution of the Symmetric Tridiagonal Eigenproblem, was supervised by Ilse Ipsen; she was Ipsen's first student.

She joined the University of Colorado Boulder faculty in 1989, as the only woman on the computer science faculty. She became chair of the computer science department there twice, taking advantage of the position to focus on improving both faculty diversity and job satisfaction, before retiring in 2019.

Contributions

In 2008, she founded a biennial conference, the Rocky Mountain Celebration of Women in Computing.

References

External links
Home page

Year of birth missing (living people)
Living people
American computer scientists
American women computer scientists
Williams College alumni
Yale University alumni